The Resurrectionists officially named the Congregation of the Resurrection of Our Lord Jesus Christ, abbreviated CR is a Catholic clerical religious congregation of Pontifical Right for men (Priest, Brother or Permanent Deacon). It was founded in 1836 by three men, Bogdan Jański, Peter Semenenko and Hieronim Kajsiewicz on the heels of the Polish Great Emigration.

History 
The Congregation of the Resurrection began in Paris on Ash Wednesday of 1836. Bogdan Janski, Peter Semenenko, and Jerome Kajsiewicz, the first three members, are regarded as the founders.

As a university student in Warsaw, Janski became involved in various student movements. He then studied economics in France, England, and Germany. Disenchanted with various social movements, he began to assist Polish exiles living in France, where he worked as a tutor. He supplemented his meager income as a contributor to encyclopedic dictionaries and dispersed his funds among poor Polish exiles throughout France.

Janski sent two of his associates, Peter Semenenko and Jerome Kajsiewicz to Rome to work on re-establishing the Polish college to educate priests for Poland. Joining them, the three established a small community. Semenenko and Kajsiewicz were ordained in 1842. Pope Pius IX advised them to "Organize yourselves in a way that will do the most good for the Church". The name of the Congregation refers to the bells sounded in Rome at noon on Easter Sunday, 1842, when the first seven brothers left the Catacombs of San Sebastiano, near San Sebastiano fuori le mura, after their religious vows.

In 1866 the Collegio Polacco (Polish College) college was finally opened due to the efforts of the Congregation of the Resurrection, which raised the first funds to which Princess Odelscalchi, Pius IX, and others contributed later.

As consecrated religious, resurrectionists profess the vows of poverty, chastity and obedience.

Their life as consecrated religious within the Congregation of the Resurrection is fulfilled as a Priest, Brother or Permanent Deacon.

Internationally, they are divided into three Provinces and one Region, ministering in sixteen countries worldwide. The Community works and has its missions in Italy, Poland, Bulgaria, Austria, Germany, Canada, the United States, Brazil, Bolivia, Australia, Bermuda, Mexico, Ukraine, Belarus, Slovakia, and Israel. The Congregation has its Motherhouse in Rome. The superior general and the general council are located there. The current superior general is the Very Reverend Paul S. Voisin, C.R.

One of the principal aims of the Congregation is providing and improving religious education.

See also
 Polish Cathedral style
 Roman Catholicism in Poland
 Polonia
 St. Hyacinth Basilica
 St. Hedwig's in Chicago
 St. John Cantius in Chicago
 St. Stanislaus Kostka Church (Chicago, Illinois)
 St. Wenceslaus in Chicago

References

External links

 Congregation of the Resurrection website
 Congregation of the Resurrection (Ontario Kentucky Province) website
 Congregation of the Resurrection (USA Province) website

 
Polish diaspora in Europe
Religious organizations established in 1836
Catholic religious institutes established in the 19th century
1836 establishments in France